John Martin Thorp (1927 – 23 March 2017) was a New Zealand chemistry researcher, university lecturer, and the author of several books, including two autobiographies on his life as a transman.

Early life, education, and transition 
Born in 1927 in the United Kingdom, Thorp was educated at University of London, graduating with a BSc(Hons) in 1949 and PhD in 1951. He then lectured in inorganic and physical chemistry at Guy's Hospital Medical School, London. With the support of his friend (and future wife) Joan, who saved him from suicide, Thorp began his transition in the late 1950s with illegal and risky surgeries, and legally changed his name to John Martin in 1960.

Move to New Zealand 
In 1960 Thorp and his first wife, Joan, moved to New Zealand to escape intense media scrutiny and to take up a position as a chemistry lecturer at University of Auckland. The media scrutiny continued in New Zealand after being outed by The New Zealand Herald.

After several years of work in Auckland, Thorp was well-regarded as a scientist and in 1969 moved to Department of Scientific and Industrial Research (New Zealand) (DSIR), where he remained until Joan developed heart problems in 1982. He then retired to spend more time together, living in Coromandel Peninsula until her death in 1989.

Later life 
In 1995 Thorp met his second wife, Hazel, with whom he ran a bed and breakfast in Coromandel before moving to Thames in 2000.

On 23rd March 2017 the car driven by Thorp was struck by a train on a level crossing near Morrinsville while driving home from Waikato Hospital. He died immediately, but his wife Hazel walked away and was taken to Waikato Hospital.

Key works 

 Thorp, JM. 2006. A Change for Good. Auckland, NZ: Cape Catley
 Thorp, JM. 2010. Second Chance. Auckland, NZ: Heather Mackay

References 

1927 births
2017 deaths
New Zealand scientists
New Zealand autobiographers
Transgender scientists
Transgender men
Academic staff of the University of Auckland
New Zealand transgender people
Railway accident deaths in New Zealand